The discography of Australian rock band Gang of Youths consists of three studio albums, one live album, four extended plays and 23 singles.

Albums

Studio albums

Live albums

Extended plays

Singles

As lead artist

As featured artist

Other contributions

Notes

References

Discographies of Australian artists
Rock music group discographies
Alternative rock discographies